Andrew Robin Birley (born 28 October 1974) is a British archaeologist and the Director of Excavations on the site of Vindolanda. He is the son of Robin Birley and grandson of Eric Birley, who founded the department of Archaeology at Durham University. He graduated from the University of Leicester in the summer of 1996 and has been working on the site for 18 years, ten of which have been in full-time employment by the Vindolanda Trust.

Birley is responsible for the day-to-day running of the excavations and the welfare of the volunteers while on the site. He began his PhD in 2004 and  completed it in 2010. His doctoral thesis was titled "The nature and significance of extramural settlement at Vindolanda and other selected sites on the Northern Frontier of Roman Britain". Birley has appeared in a number of television programmes about Roman Britain and archaeology for the BBC, the History Channel, National Geographic and the Discovery Channel.

Published works include relevant contributions to the Vindolanda Excavation Reports from 1997 to 2009, the 'Eyeopener' series, 'Following the Eagle', as well as a fascicule on Roman locks and keys from the site of Vindolanda.

He has also appeared on the British TV series Digging for Britain and How the Celts Saved Britain.

Publications
Birley, A. 1997. Vindolanda Research Reports. New Series. Volume IV. The Small Finds Fasicule II. Security: The Keys and Locks. Greenhead: Roman Army Museum
Birley, Andrew R. 2001. Vindolanda’s Military Bath Houses. Greenhead: Roman Army Museum
Birley A. and Blake, J. 2005. Vindolanda Excavations 2003-2004: Vindolanda Research Report Greenhead: Roman Army Museum
Birley A. and Blake, J. 2007. Vindolanda Excavations 2005-2006: Vindolanda Research Report Greenhead: Roman Army Museum
Birley A. 2013. ‘The fort Wall: A great divide?’ In Breaking Down Boundaries, Hadrian’s Wall in the 21st Century. Collins and Symonds eds, JRA supplementary Series 93. Portsmouth, Rhode Island. 85-103
Birley A. 2016. ‘The complexity of intramural and extramural relationships on the northern frontier of Roman Britain – a Vindolanda case study’ In Small Finds & Ancient Social Practices in the Northwest Provinces of the Roman Empire. Hoss & Whitmore eds. Oxbow Books. Oxford. 146-173
Birley A & Alberti M. 2021. Vindolanda Excavation Research Report: Focusing on Post-Roman Vindolanda. Chesterholm Museum publications. Bardon Mill.

See also
Eric Birley
Robin Birley
Anthony Birley
Patricia Birley
Vindolanda

References

External links
Entry on Birley family genealogy
 Vindolanda Trust

British archaeologists
Alumni of the University of Leicester
1974 births
Living people
Scholars of Hadrian's Wall
20th-century archaeologists
21st-century archaeologists
Andrew